Henry Staff (born 8 March 1991) is an English professional rugby union player who plays for RFU Championship side, Bedford Blues as a Centre.

Career 
Educated at Bedford Modern School, Staff showed precocious talent for the game and in 2009 was made Captain of the England U18 team for Rugby Europe. Staff made his professional debut with Saracens F.C., having been part of the 2008 Saracens Academy with Owen Farrell,  before joining Bedford Blues for two years.  He then signed for Rosslyn Park F.C. for 11 months before returning to Bedford Blues in June 2014.

References 

1991 births
Living people
English rugby union players
Bedford Blues players
Saracens F.C. players
Rosslyn Park F.C. players
Rugby union centres
People educated at Bedford Modern School